Foyer S.A. is an insurance company, based in Leudelange, in south-western Luxembourg.  The company offers services to both individuals and businesses, covering a range of products, including: life insurance, car insurance, home insurance, health insurance, liability insurance, travel insurance, and savings products for individuals; and health insurance, group insurance, and corporate-owned life insurance for businesses.

History
The company was founded in 1922 by Léon Laval, Max Lambert, Joseph Bach and Max Menager as Le Foyer, Compagnie Luxembourgeoise d'Assurances S.A., a name that was changed to 'Foyer' in 2005.  Foyer is listed on the Luxembourg Stock Exchange, where it is a smallest of the ten component companies of the main LuxX Index stock market index, and Euronext Brussels.

References

External links
 Foyer official website

Insurance companies of Luxembourg
Leudelange
Financial services companies established in 1922
Brands of Luxembourg
1922 establishments in Luxembourg